Peter Paul may refer to:

Full name
 Peter Paul (actor) (born 1957), American actor, producer, television personality and bodybuilder
 Peter F. Paul (born 1948), American lawyer, entrepreneur, and convicted criminal
 Peter Lewis Paul  (1902–1989), Canadian Maliseet ethnohistorian

Given name[s]
 Peter Paul (given names), includes a list

Surname
 Pradeeban Peter-Paul (born 1977), Canadian table tennis player

Other
 Peter Paul Candy Manufacturing Company, now a subsidiary of Hershey Foods

See also
 Peter and Paul (disambiguation)
 Peter, Paul and Mary, an American folk group